The Man Who Forgot is a lost 1917 silent film directed by Emile Chautard and starring Robert Warwick. This movie is an adaptation of the book of the same name by James Hay.

Cast
Robert Warwick - The Man (aka John Smith)
Doris Kenyon - Edith Mallon
Gerda Holmes - The Woman, (or Mary Leslie
Alex Shannon - Al Simpson (*billed Alex K. Shannon)
Ralph Delmore - Senator Mallon
John Reinhardt - Charles Waller
Frederick Truesdell - Congressman Mannersley (*as Frederick C. Truesdell)

Plot 
An opium addict living in China decides to return home to the United States, only to become addicted to alcohol. He decides to stop drinking after forgetting his past and realizing what he has become. He changes his name to John Smith and starts fighting against liquor interests.

References

External links
The Man Who Forgot at IMDb.com
allmovie/synopsis:The Man Who Forgot

1917 films
American silent feature films
Lost American films
Films directed by Emile Chautard
1917 drama films
Silent American drama films
American black-and-white films
World Film Company films
1917 lost films
Lost drama films
1910s American films